The 2021 WAFL Women's season was the third season of the WAFL Women's (WAFLW). The season commenced on 20 February and concluded with the Grand Final on 11 July 2021. The competition was contested by six clubs, the same as the previous season.

Clubs

Ladder

Finals series

Semi-finals

Preliminary final

Grand Final

Awards
 captain Ella Smith claimed the 2021 Dhara Kerr Award after finishing with 15 votes tied with ’s Abbey Dowrick, who was deemed ineligible to win the award after being suspended in Round 15.

 Dhara Kerr Award
 Ella Smith

 WAFLW Joanne Huggins Leading Goal Kicker Award
 Kate Bartlett

 WAFLW Cath Boyce Rookie of the Year Award
 Kloe Taylor

 Coach of the Year
 Adam Dancey

 Rogers Cup Fairest and Best
Noa McNaughton

 Rogers Cup Leading Goal Kicker
 Elissa Price

 Rogers Cup Rising Star
 Noa McNaughton

 Reserves Premiers

 Reserves Fairest and Best
Nikki Phillips & Jacinta Anderson

Reserves Leading Goal Kicker
 Chloe Sauzier

References

 
W